Preska is a small settlement in the hills northeast of Sodražica in southern Slovenia. It no longer has any permanent residents. The area is part of the traditional region of Lower Carniola and is now included in the Southeast Slovenia Statistical Region.

Name
The name Preska is derived from the noun preseka 'forest clearing', referring to land that was cleared for settlement.

References

External links
Preska on Geopedia

Populated places in the Municipality of Sodražica